Newport railway station served the suburb of Newport, Borough of Middlesbrough, England, from 1830 to 1915 on the Middlesbrough branch of the Stockton and Darlington Railway.

History 
The station was opened on 27 December 1830 by the Stockton and Darlington Railway. It closed on 8 August 1915, although it continued to be used for excursions in 1932 and 1956.

References 

Stockton and Darlington Railway
Former London and North Western Railway stations
Railway stations in Great Britain opened in 1830
Railway stations in Great Britain closed in 1915
1830 establishments in England
1915 disestablishments in England